Americoliva carolinensis is an extinct species of gastropod in the family Olividae.

References

Olividae